Moriya was an ancient Indo-Aryan tribe of northeastern South Asia whose existence is attested during the Iron Age.

Location
The Moriyas lived to the northeast of Kosala, from which they were separated by the Anomā or Rāptī river. The Moriyas' western neighbours were the Koliyas, while the Mallakas lived to their east, and the Sarayū river was their southern border.

The capital of the Moriyas was Pipphalivana, which the 7th century CE Chinese pilgrim Xuanzang later referred to by the name of Nyagrodhavana.

Name

The Moriyas originally obtained their name from the Mora (peacock) because the peacock was their totem.

History
Like the other republican tribes neighbouring them, the Moriyas were an Indo-Aryan tribe in the eastern Gangetic plain in the Greater Magadha cultural region.

After the death of the Buddha, the Moriyas claimed a share of his relics from the Mallakas of Kusinārā, in whose territory he had passed away and had been cremated.

King Ajātasattu of Magadha annexed The Moriyas soon after he had annexed the Vajjika League.

Legacy
The Moriya tribe were the ancestors of the Maurya dynasty who under the leadership of Candagutta Moriya in the 4th century BCE seized power in the Magadha empire. Candagutta and his descendants would expand Magadha's empire so that it at one point ruled most of South Asia.

Under the reign of Candagutta's grandson Asoka, who was a patron of Buddhism, Buddhist writers attempted to connect Asoka to the Buddha by claiming that his ancestral tribe, the Moriyas, were descended from Sakyas who had fled from the Kauśalya king Viḍūḍabha's annexation of their state by fleeing into the mountains. The record of the oldest Buddhist texts, according to which both the Moriyas and the Sakyas were among the tribes who claimed a share of the Buddha's relics from the Mallakas of Kusinārā, however shows that the Moriyas were contemporaneous with the Sakyas, and therefore already existed before the destruction of the Sakya republic; the geographical location of the Moriya republic, which was further to the south of Sakya, furthermore counters the claim that the Moriyas were descended from Sakyas who had fled into the Himālaya mountains, which were to the north of the Sakya state.

Political and social organisation

Republican institutions

The Assembly
Like the other s, the ruling body of the Moriya republic was an Assembly of the  elders who held the title of s (meaning "rulers"), whose sons were the s ("princes").

The Council
The Assembly met rarely, and the administration of the republic was instead in the hands of the Council, which was a smaller body of the Assembly composed of councillors selected from the membership of the Assembly. The Council met more often than the Assembly and was directly in charge of administering the republic.

The Consul
The Moriya Assembly elected from among the s a chief who would be the head of the republic and run its administration with the help of the Council.

References

Sources

Ancient peoples of India
Ancient peoples of Nepal
Gaṇa saṅghas